The Neiman Marcus Building is a historic commercial structure located in the Main Street District in downtown Dallas, Texas (USA). It is the corporate headquarters and flagship store of Neiman Marcus. It is the last of the original department stores still serving downtown Dallas. It is listed on the National Register of Historic Places as a contributing property of the Dallas Downtown Historic District.

History
The building was designed for Neiman Marcus to replace its previous store on Elm Street which burned in 1913. Designed to be fireproof and accommodate additional floors as needed, the red brick and white stone building opened in 1914 with four floors at the corner of Main and Ervay. In 1926, the company leased adjacent land and an identical four-story addition extended the store facing Ervay to Commerce Street that it completed in 1927. This addition, designed by architect George Dahl, doubled the retail space, replaced the exterior brick veneer with white terra cotta, and enlarged the store's entrances. The design of the building was based on Renaissance Revival architecture, and the interior featured an impressive double staircase.  In 1931, the building was air-conditioned in an elaborate stunt from New York offices via a Western Union link.

The building continued to expand with growth, and in 1941 every floor of the building was remodeled. Over the years, the store acquired adjacent land to the west along Commerce Street and Main Street. Beginning in 1951 and ending in 1953 two additional floors were added to the original building in a similar but less detailed manner, bringing the store to six floors. New six-story structures, modern in style, were built adjacent to the store along Commerce Street and Main Street. These additions again doubled the size of the store, although the new buildings did not match the original store's design. The additions provided greater room for employee services, a penthouse restaurant and expanded departments. During the late 1950s, a seventh floor was added in a similar style to the previous fifth and sixth floor additions.

On December 19, 1964, the building burned in the costliest blaze in the city's history, destroying $5–10 million in merchandise, art objects and antique furniture. Remarkably, the building was not destroyed, and it reopened just 27 days later.

The last major expansion added two floors to the top of the entire complex in 1983, giving the structure a height of nine stories. These additional floors provided more room for the growing department store chain's corporate offices.

During the late 1980s, Neiman Marcus considered leaving the building for a new downtown shopping center, but with revitalization of the Main Street District the store remained in its original location. Today, the flagship store serves as an important anchor in the Dallas retail scene as a reminder of the city's retailing history.

Features
The Zodiac is the signature lunch restaurant which has been in operation for over 50 years. Located on the sixth floor, it is known as the place to mingle with the who's-who of downtown.
The flagship store is the centerpiece of Neiman Marcus holiday celebrations. Each year the building's exterior is covered in thousands of lights, a special Christmas Tree is commissioned and holiday windows are revealed to eager crowds.

Gallery

See also

National Register of Historic Places listings in Dallas County, Texas

References

External links

Neiman Marcus
Neiman Marcus Flagship Store
Neiman Marcus Building
The size of Neiman-Marcus stores, including the original store

Buildings and structures in Dallas
Recorded Texas Historic Landmarks
Historic department store buildings in the United States